"El Apagón" is a song by Bad Bunny from Un Verano Sin Ti.

El Apagón may also refer to:
"El Apagón", a song by Yuri from Soy Libre
El Apagón, an album by Dante Spinetta

See also
Apagón